Griggsville is a city in Pike County, Illinois, United States. The population was 1,226 at the 2010 census.

Geography
The community is in northeast Pike County approximately four miles west of the Illinois River. Pittsfield lies about seven miles to the southwest along Illinois Route 107.

History 
Griggsville was named for its founder, Richard Griggs.

Demographics

As of the census of 2000, there were 1,258 people, 500 households, and 360 families residing in the city. The racial makeup of the city was 99.21% White, 0.16% African American, 0.08% Asian, 0.24% from other races, and 0.32% from two or more races. Hispanic or Latino of any race were 0.24% of the population.

There were 500 households, out of which 36.2% had children under the age of 18 living with them, 58.2% were married couples living together, 10.2% had a female householder with no husband present, and 27.8% were non-families. 24.2% of all households were made up of individuals, and 12.0% had someone living alone who was 65 years of age or older. The average household size was 2.49 and the average family size was 2.92.

In the city, the population was spread out, with 27.9% under the age of 18, 6.6% from 18 to 24, 26.9% from 25 to 44, 22.1% from 45 to 64, and 16.5% who were 65 years of age or older. The median age was 37 years. For every 100 females, there were 92.6 males. For every 100 females age 18 and over, there were 88.2 males.

The median income for a household in the city was $31,875, and the median income for a family was $36,071. Males had a median income of $27,454 versus $18,182 for females. The per capita income for the city was $14,578. About 10.2% of families and 12.3% of the population were below the poverty line, including 15.3% of those under age 18 and 10.8% of those age 65 or over.

Events
Griggsville hosts an Apple Festival on the third weekend of each September, along with the Western Illinois Fair, traditionally held during the third week of June.  The Western Illinois Fair, in its 120th year, is one of the oldest fairs in the state of Illinois.

Purple martins

Griggsville is located between the Mississippi River and the Illinois River and the hot muggy summers are the perfect habitat for mosquitoes. Amid growing concern over the use of pesticides to control mosquitoes, the town came up with an alternate abatement method. J.L. Wade, a Griggsville resident and owner of a local antenna manufacturing factory realized that Griggsville was right in the migration path of the purple martin, the largest bird in the swallow family, supposedly able to eat 2,000 mosquitoes in a single day.  J.L. Wade quickly realized that to get the purple martins to stay, he simply needed to give them a reason to stay, so he converted his antenna factory into a bird house building factory. The mosquito population dwindled, which lead the town to adopt the nickname "The Purple Martin Capital of the Nation", as well as labeling the purple martin "America's Most Wanted Bird."  Additionally, Wade's purple martin business, formerly Trio Manufacturing, published a newsletter called The Nature Society News.  The purple martin factory has been recently sold to a Chicago businessman.  Griggsville has installed over 5,000 birdhouses along the city streets, including a 562-apartment high rise, reaching a height of 70 ft.

Notable person

 Lew Hitch, basketball player for the Minneapolis Lakers (1951–1957)

Points of interest

 The Purple Martin High-Rise is located in central Griggsville on Illinois Route 107.
 Ray Norbut State Fish and Wildlife Area
Lighthouse Baptist church, the oldest continuous operating church in Pike County.

See also
 Griggsville Landing Lime Kiln

Sources

Stead, George A. "Prologue to the Genealogy of the Steads" [transcribed by JN Mahon - 1999] "Griggsville--Boom, Town on the Frontier" retrieved from archives at the Skinner House  in Griggsville, IL. November 29, 2007

Cities in Illinois
Cities in Pike County, Illinois
Populated places established in 1833
1833 establishments in Illinois